A nanobe is a tiny filamental structure first found in some rocks and sediments.  Some scientists hypothesize that nanobes are the smallest form of life, 1/10 the size of the smallest known bacteria.

No conclusive evidence exists that these structures are, or are not, living organisms, so their classification is controversial.

The 1996 discovery of nanobes was published in 1998 by Philippa Uwins et al., from the University of Queensland, Australia. They were found growing from rock samples (both full-diameter and sidewall cores) of Jurassic and Triassic sandstones, originally retrieved from an unspecified number of oil exploration wells off Australia's west coast. While Uwins et al. present assertions against it, they do not exclude the possibility that the nanobes are from a surface contaminant, not from the rock units cited.

The smallest are just 20 nanometers in diameter. Some researchers believe that these structures are crystal growths, but the staining of these structures with dyes that bind to DNA might indicate that they are living organisms.

They are similar to the structures found in ALH84001, a Mars meteorite found in the Antarctic. A 2022 study concluded that ALH84001 did not contain Martian life; the discovered organic molecules were found to be associated with abiotic processes (ie, "serpentinization and carbonation reactions that occurred during the aqueous alteration of basalt rock by hydrothermal fluids") produced on the very early Mars four billion years ago instead.

Nanobes are similar in size to nanobacteria, which are also structures that had been proposed to be extremely small living organisms. However, these two should not be confused. Nanobacteria were thought to be cellular organisms, while nanobes are hypothesized (by some) to be a previously unknown form of life or protocells.

Claims 

 It is a living organism (contains DNA or some analogue, and reproduces).
 Has a morphology similar to Actinomycetes and fungi.
 Nanobes are about 20 nm in diameter, which may be too small to contain the basic elements for an organism to exist (DNA, ribosomes, etc.), suggesting that if they grow and reproduce they would need to do so in an unconventional way.
 The Martian meteorite ALH84001, discovered in 1984 in the Antarctic, contained similar tubular structures which some astrobiologists suggested could be evidence of life at an earlier time on Mars.

Responses
A review in Microbes and Environments of the various ultra-small forms of proposed life states that the main criticism of nanobes is that they appear too small to contain the biochemical machinery needed to sustain life. The review also states that there is no evidence that nanobes are organisms in themselves and not fragments of larger organisms.

Tony Taylor was one of the authors of the original nanobe paper. He argues that the conspicuous lack of phosphorus in the X-ray spectroscopy data and the failure to find DNA using various DNA amplification techniques demonstrates that nanobes do not have any DNA or RNA. He also argues that they may have a completely different mechanism for heredity, which would account for many of their unusual chemical and physical properties.

See also 
 Mycoplasma—smallest known bacteria (300 nm)
 Nanoarchaeum—smallest known archaeum (400 nm)
 Nanobacteria—possible lifeforms smaller than bacteria (<200 nm)
 Pandoravirus—one of the largest known viruses (1000 nm)
 Parvovirus—smallest known viruses (18-28 nm)
 Pithovirus—largest known virus (1500 nm)
 Prion—smallest known infectious agent (≈10 nm)
 Protocell
 Ultramicrocells—possible dormant forms of larger cells (200 nm)

References

External links 
 Color photo of a nanobe colony
 Definition of nanobe
 Introduction to nanobes
 Nanobe images and links
 Transcript of 7.30 Report interview of Philippa Uwins
 Size Limits of Very Small Microorganisms Proceedings of a Workshop organized by the National Academies of Sciences
 
 
 How Small Can Life Be? on NAI news.

Microbiology
Hypothetical life forms